Øystein "Sid" Ringsby (born 16 February 1961) is a Norwegian bassist best known for playing with Road, TinDrum, The Snakes, TNT, Ken Hensley, Wild Willy's Gang and JORN, Jørn Lande's solo band. 
His recording rock career started 1984 as he became a member of the band Road, and since then he has been in bands such as Tindrum, The Snakes, Diezel, Jorn, Vestlandsfanden, Ken Hensley & Live Fire and TNT. 
He is recognized as one of the most versatile bassplayers in the Norwegian Rock scene, with a lot of other recording artists to his credit

Equipment 
Sid mostly uses Stuart Spector basses, both NS-2 basses made in the US and NS-4 and Euro 4LX models made in the Czech Republic. He uses Ampeg SVT-CL heads and Ampeg Enclosures.

Selected Discography

TinDrum
 Drums of War (1988)
 How About This?! (1989)
 Cool, Calm & Collected (1991)

Diezel
 Willpower (1995)

Diesel Dahl & Friends
 reCYCLEd (1997)

The Snakes
Once Bitten (1998)
 Live in Europe (1999)

Jørn Lande Starfire  (2000)
Worldchanger (2001)
Lonely Are the Brave (2008)
Spirit Black (2009)
Live on Death Road (2019)
 Heavy Rock Radio 2 (2019)

TNT
 All the Way to the Sun (2005)
 Hidden Treasure(Single)(2013)

References

1961 births
Living people
Norwegian male bass guitarists
TNT (Norwegian band) members
The Snakes (band) members
The Company of Snakes members